Baron Chorley, of Kendal in the County of Westmorland, is a title in the Peerage of the United Kingdom. It was created on 16 November 1945 for the barrister, academic and Labour politician, Robert Chorley. He was Sir Ernest Cassel Professor of Commercial and Industrial Law at the University of London from 1930 to 1946 and served as a Lord-in-waiting (government whip in the House of Lords) from 1946 to 1950 in the Labour administration of Clement Attlee. The second Baron, who succeeded his father in 1978, was one of the ninety elected hereditary peers elected remain in the House of Lords after the passing of the House of Lords Act of 1999, where he sat as a cross-bencher.  the title is held by his son.

Barons Chorley (1945)
Robert Samuel Theodore Chorley, 1st Baron Chorley (1895–1978)
Roger Richard Edward Chorley, 2nd Baron Chorley (1930–2016)
Nicholas Rupert Debenham Chorley, 3rd Baron Chorley (born 1966), educated at Marlborough College followed by Durham University (BSc) and Edinburgh University (MSc); Director at IT firm Hexagon Safety and Infrastructure

The heir apparent is the present holder's son Hon. Patrick Chorley (b. 2000).

Arms

Notes

References
Kidd, Charles, Williamson, David (editors). Debrett's Peerage and Baronetage (1990 edition). New York: St Martin's Press, 1990, 

Baronies in the Peerage of the United Kingdom
Noble titles created in 1945